Anauxesida is a genus of beetles in the family Cerambycidae, containing the following species:

subgenus Anauxesida
 Anauxesida amaniensis Breuning, 1965
 Anauxesida cuneata Jordan, 1894
 Anauxesida fuscoantennalis Breuning, 1964
 Anauxesida haafi Breuning, 1961 
 Anauxesida lineata Jordan, 1894
 Anauxesida longicornis (Fabricius, 1781)
 Anauxesida orientalis Breuning, 1948
 Anauxesida tanganjicae Breuning, 1958

subgenus Nimbanauxesida
 Anauxesida camerunica Breuning, 1978
 Anauxesida guineensis Breuning, 1966
 Anauxesida nimbae Lepesme & Breuning, 1952

References

Agapanthiini